358th may refer to:

358th Bombardment Squadron, inactive United States Air Force unit
358th Fighter Group, inactive United States Army Air Force unit
358th Fighter Squadron (358 FS), part of the 355th Fighter Wing at Davis-Monthan Air Force Base, Arizona

See also
358 (number)
358, the year 358 (CCCLVIII) of the Julian calendar
358 BC